Belmont is an unincorporated community in Crawford County, in the U.S. state of Arkansas.

History
A post office was in operation at Belmont from 1848 until 1905.

References

Unincorporated communities in Crawford County, Arkansas